Bohemians–Shamrock Rovers is an Irish football rivalry involving two of the most successful clubs in the League of Ireland. It is also a local derby, one of many involving Dublin clubs. The fixture is over a century in existence and has developed into an intense one, traditionally attracting large attendances.
The tie has been played out at numerous venues across the city, with Dalymount Park being the stadium most synonymous with the fixture, having hosted more games than any other.

History
The first game played between the two sides was a Leinster Senior Cup fixture on Saturday, 9 January 1915. The game, staged at Dalymount Park, finished 3–0 to Bohemians. Shamrock Rovers achieved their first victory over Bohemians when they defeated them in the semi–final of the FAI Cup in 1921–22. In 1945, the two clubs contested the FAI Cup final in front of a record attendance of almost 45,000 people, with Rovers winning the game 1–0. In 1969, Bohemians dropped their amateur ethos in favour of professionalism. The subsequent success achieved by the club and the demise of Drumcondra, positioned them as the major club on the Northside. Since then, the relatively minor rivalry that existed between Shamrock Rovers and Bohemians has developed into a classic rivalry, producing intense games and large attendances.

While there have been many examples over the years of the importance of the rivalry to the supporters of each club, one of the more recent incidents of note was the signing of Tony Grant and James Keddy by Bohs from Rovers, which led to a pig's head being thrown onto the pitch during their first game versus their old club, in a gesture aimed at Grant in particular. The incident was one of many to reach the front pages of Ireland's newspapers, particularly over the last ten to fifteen years and remained a topic of humour amongst the media for weeks after. In contrast, some of the darker incidents of recent times have been the desecration of the monument commemorating the former home of Shamrock Rovers, Glenmalure Park, and two instances of crowd trouble at Dalymount Park in 2000 and Richmond Park in 2003, with the latter resulting in the eviction of Rovers from the Inchicore venue. While violence at the fixture is increasingly sporadic, a large Garda presence remains commonplace. In 2016 during an away 4-0 for Rovers, fans from both sides invaded the pitch, fighting was reported with the Garda Public Order unit intervening.

Rovers and Bohs games attracted relatively large crowds in the 1980s and 1990s, including two FAI Cup fixtures in the 1993–94 season which saw over 10,000 people at each, but the attendances at the fixture have generally followed the same sliding trend as the rest of the League's fixtures over the last forty years. A significant drop occurred during the second half of the previous decade as a result of Shamrock Rovers playing their matches in Tolka Park, Richmond Park and Dalymount Park and the club having an average attendance of just over 1,000 during these years. The attendances rose in 2009, largely due to Rovers' move to Tallaght Stadium and, Bohs' status as League of Ireland champions, with the attendance at one game doubling the previous encounter.

Culture
The clubs originate from separate sides of the city. Bohemians were founded on the Northside of Dublin in Phibsboro and have remained there since, while Shamrock Rovers were founded in Ringsend, on the Southside. They played on the Northside for a significant proportion of their homeless years, but have spent the majority of their history on the Southside, seemingly moving alongside the River Dodder. Both clubs naturally draw the majority of their support from the side of the city that they're native to, but maintain a significant minority of support drawn from the rest of Dublin.
Both clubs also share less significant rivalries with other Dublin clubs Shelbourne and St Patrick's Athletic.

Results

League

Cup

Statistics
Since 1921/1922 season

See also
Bohemians
Shamrock Rovers
Derbies in the League of Ireland
Major football rivalries

References

External links
Shamrock Rovers Website
Bohemians Website
BreakingNews.ie Match Reports (2001–2010)
The RSSSF Archive

Derbies in the League of Ireland
Bohemian F.C.
Shamrock Rovers F.C.